Phostria linealis is a moth in the family Crambidae. It was described by Achille Guenée in 1854. It is found in French Guiana and Suriname.

References

Phostria
Moths described in 1854
Moths of South America